László Vasile Gergely (born 28 October 1941) is a Romanian former football player and manager.

Club career
Vasile Gergely was born on 28 October 1941 in Baia Mare and started playing football in Divizia B at local club, CSM Baia Mare. Gergely made his Divizia A debut under coach Gheorghe Ola on 19 August 1962, playing for Viitorul București in a 7–0 home victory against Minerul Lupeni, but in the middle of the season the club dissolved and he went to play for Dinamo București, making just one appearance in the second half of the season as the club won the title. In the next two seasons, he helped the club win another two titles, appearing in 3 games in the first and in 20 in the second. During his eight seasons spent at Dinamo, Gergely also won two Cupa României and made 8 appearances with one goal scored in European competitions. After a tournament with Dinamo in West Germany, he remained there, signing with Hertha BSC, playing 30 games in the 1970–71 Bundesliga as the club finished on the 3rd position, also appearing in two games in which he scored one goal from the Inter-Cities Fairs Cup. He was banned for life in January 1972 together with other players for throwing the game against Arminia Bielefeld and accepting a 15,000 Deutsche mark bribe in exchange. Afterwards, Gergely went to play for Durban City in South Africa where he could play because at that time the country was not a member of FIFA, winning the 1972 National Football League, also working as a police officer during that time. In November 1973, the German Football Association cancelled his and the other players suspensions, it is believed that the case was hastily and superficially tried and the players were unduly pardoned because the image of the 1974 World Cup, which was to be held in Germany would have been affected. Even though his suspension was lifted, Gergely retired at age 32, working for a while as head coach at BFC Germania 1888 and at club 1. FC Wilmersdorf where he coached juniors, also working at the club's casino. Vasile Gergely has a total of 145 matches and 7 goals scored in Divizia A and 35 appearances in Bundesliga.

International career
Vasile Gergely played 34 matches for Romania and scored two goals, making his debut on 30 September 1962 under coach Constantin Teașcă in a friendly which ended with a 4–0 victory against Morocco. He went on to play two games at the 1964 European Nations' Cup qualifiers, four at the 1966 World Cup qualifiers and five at the Euro 1968 qualifiers. Gergely played four games at the successful 1970 World Cup qualifiers, also being used by coach Angelo Niculescu in the 2–1 victory against Czechoslovakia from the group stage of the final tournament when he was sent on the field in the 81st minute in order to replace Ion Dumitru, this being his last appearance for the national team which did not advance to the next stage.

International goals
Scores and results list Romania's goal tally first. "Score" column indicates the score after each Gergely goal.

Personal life
His brothers, Iuliu and Iosif were also footballers.

Honours
Dinamo București
Divizia A: 1962–63, 1963–64, 1964–65
Cupa României: 1963–64, 1967–68
Durban City
National Football League: 1972

Notes

References

External links

1941 births
Living people
Sportspeople from Baia Mare
Romanian footballers
Olympic footballers of Romania
Romania international footballers
CS Minaur Baia Mare (football) players
FC Dinamo București players
Hertha BSC players
Association football defenders
1970 FIFA World Cup players
Liga I players
Liga II players
Bundesliga players
Romanian sportspeople of Hungarian descent
Romanian expatriate footballers
Expatriate footballers in Germany
Romanian expatriate sportspeople in Germany
Expatriate soccer players in South Africa
Romanian expatriate sportspeople in South Africa
Romanian football managers
Expatriate football managers in Germany
Romanian defectors